Mee Moua (RPA: Qaav Ruom, born June 30, 1969 in Xieng Khouang, Laos), is an American politician, and is the former president and executive director of the Asian Americans Advancing Justice -AAJC (Advancing Justice-AAJC) She served as the vice president for strategic impact initiatives at the Asian &  Islander American Health Forum (APIAHF) from 2011–12, and as a member of the Minnesota state senate from 2002-11. On February 3, 2017, Moua announced her departure from AAJC to "spend more time with her family, for her children and their future, and being the right kind of mom for them."

Early life and education 
Moua's father was a medic in the Vietnam War. At the end of the war, her family fled to Thailand when Moua was five years old. In 1978 her family, along with other Hmong refugees, moved to the United States. Moua graduated from Xavier High School, Appleton, Wisconsin in 1988.

Moua obtained an undergraduate degree from Brown University, a master's degree in public policy from the Lyndon B. Johnson School of Public Affairs at the University of Texas, and a Juris Doctor from the University of Minnesota Law School.

Minnesota State Senate 

Moua was the first Hmong American woman elected to a state legislature, where she served as a member of the Minnesota Democratic-Farmer-Labor Party. She represented District 67 in the Minnesota Senate, which includes portions of the city of Saint Paul in Ramsey County, which is in the Twin Cities metropolitan area. On May 16, 2010, she announced that she would not run for a third term.

Moua chaired the Judiciary Committee and held the highest office of any Hmong American politician. She also served on the senate's Taxes and Transportation committees, and was a member of the Finance subcommittee for the Public Safety Budget Division and the Transportation Budget and Policy Division, of the Judiciary Subcommittee for Data Practices, and of the Taxes Subcommittee for the Property Tax Division.

Moua was first elected with 60 percent of the vote in a special election held on January 29, 2002. She succeeded Senator Randy Kelly, who resigned after being elected mayor of Saint Paul. She was re-elected in November 2002 and, again, in November 2006.

In May 2010, Moua announced that she would not seek re-election. She said "My decision not to run was about my children and their future, and being the right kind of mom for them."

Campaign finance 
In 2002, Moua spent $45,852 on her campaign, including $11,200 in campaign matching funds.  Her opponent in the 2002 race for MN Senate district 67, David Racer (R), received matching funds in the amount of $7,706. In order to receive matching funds a candidate must also raise a specified amount in individual contributions and agree to campaign spending limits.  Moua received individual donor contributions in the amount of $21,599 in 2006. In 2006 she only had a single donor who contributed the $500 maximum under Minnesota campaign finance laws.  The majority, $18,899 of her $21,599 in individual contributions, were from individual contributors donating $100 or less. She received matching funds in the amount of $15,794.  Her Republican challenger, Richard Mulkern, received $9,982 in matching funds.

Per diem criticism 
In 2008, Minnesota public records indicated that Moua claimed $21,954 in per diem, the most of any senator, and effectively increased her compensation by 71 percent. In response to Moua leading the senate with her per diem claims, Republican Senator Dick Day stated "I don't know how someone like Sen. Moua who lives a few miles from the Capitol can justify to her constituents spending taxpayer dollars so recklessly." A study looking at per diem claims from 2009–10, Moua topped the list at $35,136. Also in 2010, CBS News noted that Moua as the top per diem taker.

Personal 

She is married to Yee Chang, with whom she has three children.

See also

 History of the Hmong in Minneapolis–Saint Paul
 Asian Americans Advancing Justice

References

External links
 Election of Mee Moua to the Minnesota Senate, 2002 in MNopedia, the Minnesota Encyclopedia 

 Senator Moua Web Page
 Who's Who of Asian Americans: Mee Moua Biography
 Mpls-St. Paul Magazine Article: Mee Moua in the Age of Obama (February 2009)
 Minnesota Public Radio: New senator makes history (January 30, 2002)

1969 births
Living people
Politicians from Saint Paul, Minnesota
American politicians of Hmong descent
Asian-American people in Minnesota politics
Brown University alumni
Democratic Party Minnesota state senators
Women state legislators in Minnesota
University of Minnesota Law School alumni
21st-century American politicians
21st-century American women politicians
People from Xiangkhouang province
Laotian emigrants to the United States
Lyndon B. Johnson School of Public Affairs alumni
Xavier High School (Appleton, Wisconsin) alumni
Hmong American